Massonia bifolia is a species of geophyte in the genus Massonia. It is endemic to Namibia.

Distribution 
Massonia bifolia is found from southern Namibia down to the Western Cape.

Habitat 
Massonia bifolia is found mostly in rock outcrops, in pockets of sheltered rocky sites that are locally moist during the winter growing season, and which offer shade and protection from the sun throughout the year.

Conservation status 
Massonia bifolia is classified as Least Concern.

References

External links 
 
 

Flora of Southern Africa
Flora of South Africa
Flora of the Cape Provinces
bifolia